The band Grupo Néctar was a cumbia peruana/cumbia andina style band that formed in Buenos Aires in 1994. The band had achieved popularity in Peru and amongst Peruvian diaspora communities worldwide.  They died in a traffic accident in May 2007.

History
The band was formed by Johnny Carlos Orozco Torres, Ricardo Papita Hinostroza, Enrique Orosco, and Juan Carlos Marchand in Argentina.

The band achieved its peak of popularity in the year 2000 with their song El Arbolito, which was a hit in Peru for weeks on the top charts.

On the daybreak of May 13, 2007, the band was going on tour and was scheduled to perform at a club in Buenos Aires. Most members of the band, along with other people, were being transported in a bus when the bus was in an accident. Thirteen people died in the crash, including all the founding members of the Grupo Néctar. 

The death of these members deeply impacted the Peruvian community. Communities in both Peru and Argentina mourned the death of the founding members.

The son of Johnny Orozco, Deyvis, continues to perform under the name of the "new" Grupo Néctar.

Songs
The most popular songs of the group include own hits and covers from other bands:
El arbolito (cover of Los Destellos of Peru - 1968)
Pecadora
Ojitos hechiceros
El baile de la Cumbia
La última noche
La florcita
Mi enamorada
Tú vives equivocada (cover of Grupo Cañaveral of Mexico - original title "Echarme al olvido" - 1995)
El penal
Ojitos mentirosos

References

External links
Official site

Cumbia musical groups
Musical groups established in 1994
Peruvian musical groups